Contra Costa Centre is an unincorporated community and census-designated place in Contra Costa County, California. Contra Costa Centre sits at an elevation of 92 feet (28 m). The 2010 United States census reported Contra Costa Centre's population was 5,364. Contra Costa Centre is served by the Pleasant Hill / Contra Costa Centre BART station.

It is the successor to the Waldon CDP of the 2000 census.

Geography
According to the United States Census Bureau, the CDP has a total area of 0.642 square miles (1.662 km), all of it land.

Demographics

At the 2010 census Contra Costa Centre had a population of 5,364. The racial makeup of Contra Costa Centre was 3,488 (65.0%) White, 216 (4.0%) African American, 18 (0.3%) Native American, 1,155 (21.5%) Asian, 17 (0.3%) Pacific Islander, 171 (3.2%) from other races, and 299 (5.6%) from two or more races. Hispanic or Latino of any race were 560 people (10.4%).

The census reported that 100% of the population lived in households.

There were 2,995 households, 445 (14.9%) had children under the age of 18 living in them, 883 (29.5%) were opposite-sex married couples living together, 195 (6.5%) had a female householder with no husband present, 93 (3.1%) had a male householder with no wife present.  There were 230 (7.7%) unmarried opposite-sex partnerships, and 24 (0.8%) same-sex married couples or partnerships. 1,425 households (47.6%) were one person and 148 (4.9%) had someone living alone who was 65 or older. The average household size was 1.79.  There were 1,171 families (39.1% of households); the average family size was 2.60.

The age distribution was 646 people (12.0%) under the age of 18, 521 people (9.7%) aged 18 to 24, 2,593 people (48.3%) aged 25 to 44, 1,187 people (22.1%) aged 45 to 64, and 417 people (7.8%) who were 65 or older.  The median age was 33.3 years. For every 100 females, there were 97.1 males.  For every 100 females age 18 and over, there were 96.3 males.

There were 3,211 housing units at an average density of ,of which 2,995 were occupied, 750 (25.0%) by the owners and 2,245 (75.0%) by renters.  The homeowner vacancy rate was 2.0%; the rental vacancy rate was 5.5%.  1,509 people (28.1% of the population) lived in owner-occupied housing units and 3,853 people (71.8%) lived in rental housing units.

Education
Much of Contra Costa Centre is in the Walnut Creek Elementary School District and the Acalanes Union High School District. Other parts are in the K-12 Mount Diablo Unified School District.

References

Census-designated places in Contra Costa County, California
Census-designated places in California